A Dangerous Adventure is a 1922 American silent adventure serial film directed by Sam Warner and Jack L. Warner and written by Sam Warner. The film stars Grace Darmond, Philo McCullough, Jack Richardson, Robert Agnew, Derelys Perdue, and Rex De Rosselli. The film was released by Warner Bros. on November 1, 1922.

Plot
As described in a film magazine review, two young women and their uncle trek into Africa in quest of buried treasure. They encounter wild animals, terrible natives, and rampaging storms but escape them all. The sweethearts of the women come to their rescue and bring them back.

Cast      
Grace Darmond as Marjorie Stanton
Philo McCullough as MacDonald Hayden
Jack Richardson as Herbert Brandon
Robert Agnew as Jimmy Morrison
Derelys Perdue as Edith Stanton
Rex De Rosselli as Ubanga
Omar Whitehead as Native

Chapter titles

 The Jungle Storm
 The Sacrifice
 The Lion Pit
 Brandon's Revenge
 At the Leopard's Mercy
 The Traitor
 The Volcano
 The Escape
 The Leopard's Cave
 The Jungle Water Hole
 The Hippopotamus Swamp
 The Lion's Prey
 In the Tiger's Lair
 The Treasure Cave
 The Rescue

Reception
According to Warner Bros records the film earned $83,000 domestically and $59,000 foreign.

References

External links

1922 films
American adventure films
1922 adventure films
Warner Bros. films
American silent serial films
American black-and-white films
1920s English-language films
1920s American films
Silent adventure films